Jefferson County Middle / High School (JCMHS) is a public school in unincorporated Jefferson County, Florida, with a Monticello postal address. A part of Jefferson County Schools, it serves grades 6 - 12. The school's mascot is a tiger and the school colors are orange and blue. The school was formerly housed in the historic Jefferson Academy building, opened in 1852 in the first brick school building in Florida. Minority enrollment at Jefferson County Middle / High School is about 340 and 84 percent minority. It was operated by Somerset Academy Inc. for five years. The student body is minority majority, about 60 percent African American.

History

Jefferson Academy
Jefferson Academy was established in Monticello in 1852. The school building, described as being the first school built with bricks in Florida, was constructed in 1852 using slave labor. It was designed by Samuel Carroll. Jefferson Academy alumni included William Bailey Lamar.

The school building was used for Jefferson County High School after the academy closed. The school became known as such when the white schools merged into Jefferson County High School.

Monticello High School
Also referred to as Monticello High School, the historic former school building is located at 425 West Washington Street. On March 25, 1999, it was added to the U.S. National Register of Historic Places.

The vernacular school building  was expanded on the east and west sides in 1915 and the columns added to the front, giving is a Neoclassical architecture appearance.

By 1980, the original section of the facility was no longer used as a school, and only the addition was. In 2004 the current facility opened. It had a cost of $17,200,000. The school district and the county government moved offices into the former facility.

Gallery

References

External links

 Jefferson County Middle / High School
 Monticello High School, Florida's Office of Cultural and Historical Programs

Public high schools in Florida
National Register of Historic Places in Jefferson County, Florida
Monticello, Florida
1852 establishments in Florida
Educational institutions established in 1852
Buildings and structures in Jefferson County, Florida
Defunct schools in Florida
School buildings completed in 1852